The Women's 800 metres at the 2010 Commonwealth Games as part of the athletics programme was held at the Jawaharlal Nehru Stadium on Sunday 10 October and Monday 11 October 2010.

Records

Round 1
First 2 in each heat (Q) and 2 best performers (q) advance to the Final.

Heat 1

Heat 2

Heat 3

Final

References

External links
2010 Commonwealth Games - Athletics

Women's 800 metres
2010
2010 in women's athletics